Syldavian is a fictional West Germanic language created by Hergé as the national language of Syldavia, a fictional Balkan kingdom that serves as a major setting in many of The Adventures of Tintin stories. Hergé modeled the language on Brusselian, a dialect of Dutch spoken in and around Brussels. The entire corpus of the language has been analyzed by Mark Rosenfelder.

Characteristics

As presented in the Tintin books, Syldavian has a superficial resemblance to certain Central European languages, particularly Polish and Hungarian, due to its orthography. Like Serbian, it uses both the Cyrillic and Latin scripts, although apparently in somewhat different contexts; it is most commonly written in the Cyrillic alphabet, albeit with the Latin alphabet by the royal court. It shares numerous orthographic features found in various Eastern European languages, most notably the "sz" and "cz" of Polish.

However, the language is clearly a Germanic language. Its vocabulary and grammar resembles that of Dutch and German and has little in common with any Slavic languages. But while Brusselian, Hergé's native dialect, was used as a basis for the language, Syldavian has a much more complicated grammar, with other Central European influences added.

The language also appears to have been influenced by Bordurian (another fictional language), Slavic languages and Turkish. The Syldavians often bear names of Slavic origin, such as Wladimir; the dish  that Tintin encountered also appears to be a borrowing. ( is the Polish word for shish kebab, borrowed in turn from Turkish.) Many words are based on common French slangs. For examples,  is constructed on the French Parisian slang  meaning "dog".

This language, which is Germanic but bears a great resemblance to Polish, may be likened to the artificial Romance language Wenedyk, or to the endangered Wymysorys language.

Phonology 
Syldavian boasts a rich range of sounds.

Vowels 
In addition to the diacritical marks shown in the chart below, there are acute and grave accents that may indicate stress.

Roman letters are on the left, Cyrillic letters on the right.

In addition to these letters, Syldavian also contains several digraphs and letters for which the pronunciation is uncertain:
  - uncertain, possibly //
  - uncertain.
  - 
  - 
It is only seen in one word:  ("door").
  -

Consonants 
Roman letters are on the left, Cyrillic letters on the right.

Note: As in Czech, the letter  can be syllabic, as seen in names such as Staszrvitch and Dbrnouk.

These demonstrate that the Latin-based orthography has a number of irregularities, or else these are old inconsistent spellings that have been preserved in family names but are no longer used in the standard orthography (as in Hungarian, where for example one may find the family name Széchenyi retaining a traditional spelling rather than the orthographically correct *Szécsenyi).

Note that Syldavian Cyrillic diverges in some important respects from Cyrillic as used in real-world languages, most notably by porting over Latin digraphs into the Cyrillic alphabet (for example, /ʃ/ is written "сз" instead of "ш"), and to use a few Cyrillic letters (щ, ю) for sounds for which they are never used in the real world. This, together with the use of Latin script in old medieval manuscripts, may suggest that the Syldavians adopted the Latin alphabet first, and the Cyrillic later, which is the reverse of several real-world languages (most notably Romanian) which switched from Cyrillic to Latin.

Grammar

Plurals 
 Native words are pluralized with :  - "dogs";  - "bottles"
 Loanwords are pluralized with :  - "cigarettes"

Definite articles 
Unlike Marols, but like German (shown in italics in the table), Syldavian definite articles are extensively inflected.

Indefinite articles 
 Singular:  - "a"
 Plural:  - "some"

Adjectives 
Adjectives precede nouns:

 'prohibited area'; Zekrett Politzs 'Secret Police'.

There is no sufficient evidence to tell whether adjectives change form. The rules of Dutch, a control language of Syldavian, are very complex.

Note: the derivation Klow > Klowaswa is merely one of many adjectivizations, however, compare Zyldav 'Syldavian'

Adjectives can be used to modify verbs like adverbs:

Nadja Wladimir zekrett löwt. 'Nadja secretly loves Vladimir'

Dzapeih wzryzkar eszt on vaghabontz. 'The guy is surely a tramp.'

Pronouns

Personal pronouns 

3rd person singular neuter objective and possessive and 2nd person plural pronouns are reconstructed based on Dutch and German.

Demonstrative pronouns 
 - this
 - that

Verbs 
Verbs are either weak or strong. This decides how they are conjugated.

Conjugation
Strong Verb:  'to stay'

Weak Verb: löwn 'to love'

The 2nd person conjugations are unknown, with reconstructions shown with asterisks. Corresponding German verbs and the 2 pl. imperative were used as a guideline in the reconstructions, with -szt in 2 sing. based upon German -st, although -szcz and -eh (the latter written -ещ in Cyrillic, which would be -esht in Bulgarian Cyrillic) are other possibilities.

Negatives

To negate a sentence, the particle nietz is placed after the subject, in auxiliary position.

Müsstler nietz dzem könikstz löwt. 'Müsstler does not love the king.'

In copulative sentences, nietz is placed after the verb (or czesztot) :

Müsstler eszt nietz güdd. 'Müsstler is not good.' 
Czesztot wzryzkar nietz on waghabontz! 'That's surely not a vagabond!'

Adverbs 

Most adverbs tend to be identical to adjectives in form. Adverbs can be used to modify verbs:

Nadja Wladimir zekrett löwt. 'Nadja secretly loves Vladimir'

Dzapeih wzryzkar eszt on vaghabontz. 'The guy is surely a tramp.'

Interjections

 - a curse word, perhaps equivalent to "damn". (Not found in original French edition, only English translation.)

- a more extreme form of 

- praising or surprise, could be something like "hail!" or "wow!"

- a command, probably meaning "stop!" or "halt!"

- another command, sounds almost like "shh!" and perhaps means "silence!"

- a greeting, probably "salute" or "hello".

Syntax

Verbs
The verb normally follows the object:

  'In the car stay!'

 'I love my girlfriend.'

 'I want some red wine.'

Where there's an auxiliary and a main verb, the main verb remains at the end, and the auxiliary verb moves just after the subject:

'  'They're going to open the doors.'

  'I want to stay in Klow.'

Pronouns

In earlier Syldavian the pronoun may follow the verb, and this form may still be used for emphasis:

 'Here I am, here I stay.' [medieval spelling] 
 'I'm coming, for sure!'

You can say either Eihn ben ek, Eihn bennek or Ek ben eihn, but never *Eihn ek ben (unlike English, where you can say 'Here I am'). In general "X is Y" can be inverted to "Y is X". When X is a pronoun, the inversion adds some emphasis:

, 'Good it is.'

In the  sentences in the corpus, prepositional phrases follow the verb. The comma, however, is a signal that the prepositional phrase has been moved for emphasis, or because it is an afterthought:

 Come with us to the police station!

Forms of 'be' directly follow the subject :

Könikstz eszt güdd. 'The king is good.'

Sbrodj on forwotzen eszt zona . 'Sbrodj is a forbidden zone.'

. 'Then the throne is for him.'

The merged form  'it is, that is' begins a sentence: Czesztot Tintin. "That's Tintin."

Historical changes

Samples of Syldavian from only two periods - the 14th century and the 20th century - are available. But even with such a small sample, some changes can be seen in the language over a 600-year period:

 pho became vüh ("for")
  became  ("say")
 eih became eihn ("here")
 coe became kzou ("cow")
 ön became o ("at, about")
  became  ("what")
 w and v transposed
 c (//) became k

Sample text

From a 14th-century manuscript, Noble Deeds of Ottokar IV:

Medieval Spelling

Modern Spelling

Cyrillic Spelling

English translation:
"Father Ottokar, thou falsely art king; the throne is for me." This one said thus to the other, "Come seize the sceptre." The king thus hit him, Staszrvitch, on his head. The villain fell onto the floor."

More Examples

 - "That's a dog."

 - "Hail!" (The Bordurian language borrows this as )

 - "Come with us to the Police Station." ( in the English translation.)  is a borrowing from French . The suffix  is also apparently borrowed from the Russian feminine adjective ending .

 - "A bottle of Klow water for this guy... He's thirsty!" (cf. Dutch  & cf. Swedish , "thirst". (Lit. 'He thirsts!')

 - "That's surely not a tramp! Isn't it better for him to come to the police station?" (Lit. probably "Is it better [that] he comes to the police station?")

 - "Quick! Into the boat!" (cognate literally to German )

See also
Bordurian

References

 "On the Syldavian language" by Mark Rosenfelder
 Har Brok, Is Syldavisch Slavisch? Achtergronden van het Beeldverhaal nr. 2, Bovenkarspel 1979. 

Fictional languages
Tintin
Constructed languages introduced in the 1930s
Fictional elements introduced in 1939
Constructed languages
Languages of Belgium
Culture in Brussels
Dutch dialects